, is a Japanese animation studio founded in November 2018 as a joint venture by White Fox and Egg Firm.

History
The company was founded in November 2018 as a joint venture between animation studio White Fox and production, planning and management company Egg Firm. The first work of the studio was on the anime Karakuri Circus for the episodes 22 and 31, while the first work of the company as a lead animation studio is Mushoku Tensei, which debuted in 2021.

On January 31, 2021, Egg Firm CEO and Mushoku Tensei chief producer Nobuhiro Osawa stated that he built the new production studio for Mushoku Tensei. In October 2019, production company Egg Firm explained their rationale for setting up a separate studio from the existing White Fox studio, stating they "needed a system that would allow us to move forward with the project in a continuous, long-term, and systematic manner" so they "will be able to concentrate more on the production of Mushoku Tensei." Egg Firm noted that "Studio Bind will use Mushoku Tensei as a launchpad for its full-scale animation production business.

Works

Television series

OVAs

References

External links

  

Animation studios in Tokyo
Japanese animation studios
Japanese companies established in 2018
Mass media companies established in 2018
Suginami